Earcom 2: Contradiction is an EP of six tracks by three different bands, released in October 1979 on the Fast Product label.

Track listing
12" vinyl (Fast Product FAST9B)

Side 1
Thursdays: "Perfection" (2:55)
Basczax: "Celluloid Love" (3:24)
Basczax: "Karleearn Photography" (6:17)

Side 2
Joy Division: "Autosuggestion" (6:06)
Joy Division: "From Safety to Where...?" (2:29)
Thursdays: "(Sittin' On) The Dock of the Bay" (3:48)

1979 EPs
Split EPs
Post-punk EPs